Preecha Chiocharn (born 31 December 1944) is a Thai weightlifter. He competed in the men's flyweight event at the 1976 Summer Olympics.

References

1944 births
Living people
Preecha Chiocharn
Preecha Chiocharn
Weightlifters at the 1976 Summer Olympics
Place of birth missing (living people)
Weightlifters at the 1974 Asian Games
Preecha Chiocharn
Preecha Chiocharn